Podpeč may refer to several places in Slovenia: 

Podpeč, Brezovica, a settlement in the Municipality of Brezovica
Podpeč, Dobrepolje, a settlement in the Municipality of Dobrepolje
Podpeč, Koper, a settlement in the Municipality of Koper
Podpeč nad Marofom, a settlement in the Municipality of Šentjur
Podpeč ob Dravinji, a settlement in the Municipality of Slovenske Konjice
Podpeč pod Skalo, a former settlement in the Municipality of Litija
Podpeč pri Šentvidu, a settlement in the Municipality of Šentjur